Marie J. Desonier State Nature Preserve is located in eastern Athens County, Ohio, United States.  It is heavily forested, on Jordan Run near its headwaters, in Deep Hollow.  The preserve features a loop trail, the Oak Ridge Trail, with two footbridges.  This trail can be hiked in a two-mile loop, or as a 2.5-mile loop.  There are no other developed facilities there except for a small parking area.  The preserve represents a good example of the local forest, with relatively few invasive species.

See also
Ohio public lands

External links 
 Marie J. Desonier State Nature Preserve official website

Ohio State Nature Preserves
Protected areas of Athens County, Ohio